Wanggeom-seong was the capital city of Gojoseon from 194 to 108 BC. It is also known as Wangheom-seong (王險城).

Conflicting opinions about its location
One theory suggests the capital was around the modern city of Pyongyang based on the records of Samguk yusa and Samguk sagi.  Some South Korean sources claim it was located somewhere around Liaodong (present China).

See also 
 Asadal, the mythical capital of Gojoseon, believed to be founded by Dangun

Notes

References 

Gojoseon
Wiman Joseon
Former capitals of Korea
Castles in Korea
Ancient Korean cities